Nikolay Muravyov (14 July 1794 – 23 October 1866) was an Imperial Russian military officer and General of the Russian Army. A member of the mighty Muravyov family, he distinguished himself during the battle of Warsaw (1831) of the November Uprising. He continued to serve in the military and took active part in the fights of the Crimean War. For his role in the Siege of Kars, captured on November 28, 1855 (according to Gregorian calendar), the tsar awarded him with a prestigious title "Karski" ("of Kars"), added to his surname. 

1794 births
1866 deaths
Imperial Russian Army generals
Russian nobility
Russian people of the November Uprising
Russian military personnel of the Crimean War
People of the Caucasian War
Russian military personnel of the Caucasian War